Matt Reid and John-Patrick Smith were the defending champions but chose not to defend their title.

Hsieh Cheng-peng and Peng Hsien-yin won the title after Thomas Fabbiano and Dudi Sela retired trailing 1–5 in the first set.

Seeds

Draw

References
 Main Draw
 Qualifying Draw

Seoul Open Challenger - Doubles
2017 Doubles